Goran Miscevic (born 26 March 1963) is a Canadian professional soccer coach and former player. He is the manager of German club Rot-Weiß Erfurt.

Career
Miscevic was born in Virovitica, SR Croatia, SFR Yugoslavia to a Serbian family and he played professionally in Yugoslavia and Germany. After his retirement from competitive soccer he obtained a coaching license from the German Football Association. Miscevic managed VfR Pforzheim in Germany for two years. In 1997, he immigrated to Canada and in 2000 he served as an assistant coach for Glen Shields of the Canadian Professional Soccer League. In 2003, he was appointed the head coach for the Metro Lions, and in the 2004 season led the team to a second-place position in the Eastern Conference. 

He returned to the Lions organization in 2007 (this time under the name Canadian Lions) with his assistant being former Yugoslavia international Blagoje Bratić. His tenure with the club was notable as he promoted Dejan Jakovic to the first team and secured the team a postseason berth by finishing fourth in the International Division. In 2008, he went overseas to coach Al-Wakrah Sport Club in the Qatar Stars League. In 2010, he went to Saudi Arabia to coach Al-Hazm F.C. of the Saudi Professional League. In 2011, he went to Oman to coach Salalah SC of the Oman Professional League. In 2012, he moved to the United Arab Emirates and had stints with Al Urooba and was unbeaten for 12 games in row, it was a league record, lost only 3 games in season, Al-Ittihad Kalba SC, and Al-Arabi. 

In 2017 he moved to China to coach Zhenjiang Huasa change name to Kunshan FC. In 2018 he moved to another Chinese club Yunnan Kunlu and led them into winning that year as well as a 10th place finish in 2018 Chinese Champions League, enough for gaining promotion to China League Two. In 2019 he went back to the Middle East and signed with the top division team Al-Seeb Club of the Oman Professional League. Season 2019/2020 he won Oman Professional League Championship. In 2020, he was named the head coach for FC Rot-Weiss Erfurt in the NOFV-Oberliga Südgaining promotion to Regional League North East.

References

1963 births
Living people
Sportspeople from Virovitica
Serbs of Croatia
Croatian emigrants to Canada
Naturalized citizens of Canada
Canadian people of Serbian descent
Canadian soccer coaches

Serbian White Eagles FC non-playing staff
Al-Wakrah SC managers
Al-Hazm FC managers
Salalah SC managers
Al-Ittihad Kalba SC managers
Al-Seeb Club managers
FC Rot-Weiß Erfurt managers

Canadian expatriate soccer coaches
Expatriate football managers in Germany
Canadian expatriate sportspeople in Germany
Expatriate football managers in Qatar
Expatriate football managers in Saudi Arabia
Canadian expatriate sportspeople in Saudi Arabia
Expatriate football managers in Oman
Canadian expatriate sportspeople in Oman
Expatriate football managers in the United Arab Emirates
Canadian expatriate sportspeople in the United Arab Emirates
Expatriate football managers in China
Canadian expatriate sportspeople in China

Saudi Professional League managers
UAE Pro League managers
Oman Professional League managers
Canadian Soccer League (1998–present) managers